Elena Matous (born 10 May 1953) is a retired Italian alpine skier, who competed for Italy, San Marino, Iran and Luxembourg. She had one second place in the downhill event at the 1977 Alpine Skiing World Cup and finished eighth overall.

Europa Cup results
Matous has won an overall Europa Cup and one specialty standings.

FIS Alpine Ski Europa Cup
Overall: 1974
Slalom: 1974

References

External links
 

1953 births
Living people
Italian female alpine skiers
Universiade medalists in alpine skiing
Universiade bronze medalists for Italy
Competitors at the 1981 Winter Universiade